Gelber is a surname. Notable people with the surname include:

Alexis Gelber, Goldsmith Fellow at the John F. Kennedy School of Government
Arthur Gelber, CC (1915–1998), Canadian philanthropist
Bruno Leonardo Gelber (born 1941), Argentine classical pianist
Dan Gelber (born 1960), former prosecutor, member of the Florida Senate
Dan Gelber (game designer), co-creator of the Paranoia role-playing game
Jack Gelber (1932–2003), American playwright known for his 1959 drama The Connection
Jordan Gelber (born 1975), American actor
Lady Henrietta Gelber (born 1958), English interior decorator and founder of Woodstock Designs
Lee Gelber (1938–2020), American tour guide and urban historian
Lionel Gelber, Canadian diplomat who founded the Lionel Gelber Prize in 1989
Mark H. Gelber (born 1951), American-Israeli scholar of German-Jewish literature and culture
Marvin Gelber (1912–1990), Liberal party member of the Canadian House of Commons
Moscovici Gelber (1895–1938), Romanian socialist and communist activist
 Wylie Gelber (born 1988), American bassist and guitar maker, founding member of the band Dawes
Yoav Gelber (born 1943), professor of history at the University of Haifa

See also
Gelber Berg, mountain of Bavaria, Germany
 "Gelber Stern" or "Judenstern" (German), Yellow badge
Gelber Stern (Hildesheim), historic street in Hildesheim, a city in Lower Saxony in Germany
Geber (disambiguation)
Gelb (disambiguation)